Port Perry/Hoskin Aerodrome  is located  southeast of Port Perry, Ontario, Canada.

The private airfield has a single  turf runway located in the northwest corner of Shirley Road and Graham Road in the Township of Scugog.

References

Registered aerodromes in Ontario